The Railers are an American country band based out of Nashville, Tennessee, United States. The band is composed of brothers and Missouri natives Jordan and Jonathan Lawson, & Arizona native Cassandra Lawson.  Jordan, Jonathan and Cassandra met at Northern Arizona University and moved to Nashville in 2004.

Formerly known as Tin Cup Gypsy, the band changed their name to The Railers in 2012.
In 2010, the band opened for Sara Evans and Órla Fallon in addition to headlining their own dates.  In 2012, they signed a publishing deal with Sony/ATV Music Publishing and a record deal with Warner Music Nashville.

The Railers released an EP in May 2014 titled The Railers: The Geraldine Session.  The EP includes six songs that were all recorded live in one session.  They released a single on September 24, 2014, titled "Kinda Dig the Feeling".  The song was also featured on the season 3 premiere of ABC's TV series Nashville.

Discography

Singles

Music videos

References

External links

Country music groups from Tennessee
Musical groups established in 2010
Musical groups from Nashville, Tennessee
Warner Records artists
2010 establishments in Tennessee